K. floribunda may refer to:

 Kalanchoe floribunda, a succulent plant
 Kickxia floribunda, a cancerwort native to Europe
 Kraussia floribunda, an African plant